An indirect election is expected to take place in Estonia in 2026 to elect the president of Estonia, who will be the country's head of state.

Process
By law, the president of Estonia is indirectly elected. The Riigikogu has the task of electing the president in the first instance. If no candidate receives the required supermajority of two-thirds (68 votes out of 101), the president is selected by an electoral college consisting of MPs and representatives of local (municipal) governments. If the electoral college fails to achieve a supermajority as well, the process is to return to the parliament yet again.

The incumbent Alar Karis has served one term and is eligible to be elected to a second consecutive term in office.

Candidates
Individuals must be nominated by one-fifth of the members of Riigikogu (21 MPs) in order to officially stand as candidates.

Notes

References

Presidential elections in Estonia
Estonia
2026 in Estonia